GCMC may refer to:
 Gulf Coast Medical Center
 George C. Marshall European Center for Security Studies
 Groupe de Combat en Milieu Clos, now Escouade de Contre-Terrorisme et de Libération d'Otages, a special operations group of the French Navy
 General Conference Mennonite Church
 Grand Canonical Monte Carlo methods, a computational technique used to solve physical and mathematical problems such as molecular modeling.